is a 1995 turn-based strategy video game developed by Micronet and published by Sega exclusively in Japan for the Sega Saturn. The game was followed by the sequels Heir of Zendor: The Legend and The Land (Gotha II: Tenkuu no Kishi) in 1996 and Soukuu no Tsubasa: Gotha World in 1997.

Gameplay
Gotha is a strategy game.

Reception

Next Generation reviewed the game, rating it three stars out of five, and stated that "As is, Gotha is a great tease, but not much more."

Notes

References

1995 video games
Japan-exclusive video games
Micronet co., Ltd. games
Military combat simulators
Sega games
Sega Saturn games
Sega Saturn-only games
Single-player video games
Turn-based strategy video games
Video games developed in Japan